Keego Harbor is a city in Oakland County in the U.S. state of Michigan. The population was 2,970 at the 2010 census.

History
The first non-native settlers to the area arrived between 1825 and 1830.  Cass Lake drew many wealthy residents to purchase land along the lake for vacationing.  In 1890, a railway line was built through Keego Harbor to connect to Detroit and Pontiac, making the area much more accessible.  At the turn of the century, a prominent Pontiac lawyer, Joseph E. Sawyer, purchased and platted land just to the southwest along Orchard Lake.  He built a canal to connect the smaller Dollar Lake to Cass Lake and declared the area to be a harbor on the eastern edge of Cass Lake.  He named the area Keego, which was an Ojibwe word meaning "fish" from the poem The Song of Hiawatha.  The community was originally part of West Bloomfield Township before incorporating as an independent city in 1955.

Geography

The small Dollar Lake and canal remain within the city of Keego Harbor.  The city is on the eastern shores of Cass Lake and is surrounded by Sylvan Lake on the east, Orchard Lake Village on the southwest, Waterford Township on the north, and West Bloomfield Township on the south and northwest.

Demographics

2010 census
As of the census of 2010, there were 2,970 people, 1,292 households, and 721 families living in the city. The racial makeup of the city was 84.1% White, 6.2% African American, 0.3% Native American, 2.3% Asian, 4.0% from other races, and 3.1% from two or more races. Hispanic or Latino of any race were 10.8% of the population.

There were 1,292 households, of which 32.3% had children under the age of 18 living with them, 36.1% were married couples living together, 14.0% had a female householder with no husband present, 5.7% had a male householder with no wife present, and 44.2% were non-families. 36.1% of all households were made up of individuals, and 7% had someone living alone who was 65 years of age or older. The average household size was 2.30 and the average family size was 3.08.

The median age in the city was 35.6 years. 24.8% of residents were under the age of 18; 7.9% were between the ages of 18 and 24; 33.6% were from 25 to 44; 26.1% were from 45 to 64; and 7.6% were 65 years of age or older. The gender makeup of the city was 50.3% male and 49.7% female.

2000 census
As of the census of 2000, there were 2,769 people, 1,223 households, and 664 families living in the city. The racial makeup of the city was 94.08% White, 0.61% African American, 1.16% Native American, 1.05% Asian, 1.26% from other races, and 1.84% from two or more races. Hispanic or Latino of any race were 4.37% of the population.

There were 1,223 households, out of which 30.2% had children under the age of 18 living with them, 38.1% were married couples living together, 11.7% had a female householder with no husband present, and 45.7% were non-families. 37.4% of all households were made up of individuals, and 5.2% had someone living alone who was 65 years of age or older.  The average household size was 2.26 and the average family size was 3.07.

In the city, the population was spread out, with 24.9% under the age of 18, 7.7% from 18 to 24, 41.1% from 25 to 44, 18.7% from 45 to 64, and 7.6% who were 65 years of age or older.  The median age was 33 years. For every 100 females, there were 108.5 males.  For every 100 females age 18 and over, there were 105.3 males.

The median income for a household in the city was $46,552, and the median income for a family was $49,015. Males had a median income of $37,031 versus $34,038 for females. The per capita income for the city was $26,305.  About 5.2% of families and 5.1% of the population were below the poverty line, including 6.0% of those under age 18 and 2.4% of those age 65 or over.

Education
Keego Harbor is within the West Bloomfield School District.

References

External links

City of Keego Harbor
View Fiscal Transparency Data for Keego Harbor

Cities in Oakland County, Michigan
Metro Detroit
Populated places established in 1955
1955 establishments in Michigan